Abot-Kamay na Pangarap (International title: Hands on the Dream / ) is a Philippine television drama series broadcast by GMA Network. The series is based on the 1996 film of the same title. Directed by L.A Madridejos, it stars Carmina Villarroel and Jillian Ward. It premiered on September 5, 2022 on the network's Afternoon Prime and Sabado Star Power sa Hapon line up replacing Apoy sa Langit.

The series is streaming online on YouTube.

Cast and characters 
Lead cast
Carmina Villarroel as Lyneth Santos
Jillian Ward as Analyn Santos Tanyag 

Supporting cast
Richard Yap as Roberto Jose "RJ" Tanyag
Dominic Ochoa as Michael Lobrin
Pinky Amador as Moira Barretto
Andre Paras as Luke Antonio
Kazel Kinouchi as Zoey Benitez
Jeff Moses as Reagan Tibayan
Dexter Doria as Susana "Susan" Burgos
Chuckie Dreyfus as Raymund "Ray" Meneses
Wilma Doesnt as Josa Enriquez-Valencia
Ariel Villasanta as Cromwell "Croms" Valencia

Recurring cast
Denise Barbacena as Eula Sarmiento
Patricia Coma as Grace Villar
Alexandra Mendez as Jhoanne Lery H. Dizon
John Vic De Guzman as Kenneth "Ken" Prado
Che Ramos-Cosio as Katie Enriquez
Eunice Lagusad as Karen  Elise G. Caudal
Alchris Galura as Evan Andrew L. Nicolas
Leo Martinez as Joselito "Pepe" Tanyag
Dianne dela Fuente as Patricia Menor
Allen Dizon as Carlos Benitez

Guest cast
Heart Ramos as young Analyn Santos
Sophie Albert as Hazel Roces
Kyle Ocampo as young Zoey Tanyag
Chlaui Malayao as Wendy
Elia Ilano as young Grace Villar
Jenzel Angeles as Sheba 
Alvin Francisco as Alvin
Winston Tiwaquen as Win
Jon Lucas as Tim Campos
Ariella Arida as Shamcey
Joyce Ching as Faith Villar-Castillo
Shaira Diaz as Olive Garcia
Jan Marini as Kapitana Denoy
Anjo Damiles as Oscar
Lianne Valentin as Riza
Betong Sumaya as Obet Villarin
Zonia Mejia as Jemily Villarin
Arny Ross as Bea Almasan
Samantha Lopez as Cherry Mendoza
Mavy Legaspi as Jordan Mendoza
Cassy Legaspi as Jewel Mendoza
Max Collins as Izzy
Dion Ignacio as Bart
Pekto as Elmer
Gabby Eigenmann  as Chef Benny
Jamir Zabarte
Dina Bonnevie as Giselle Tanyag

Accolades

Ratings 
According to AGB Nielsen Philippines' Nationwide Urban Television Audience Measurement People in Television Homes, the pilot episode of Abot-Kamay na Pangarap earned a 6.3% rating.

References

External links
 
 

2022 Philippine television series debuts
Filipino-language television shows
GMA Network drama series
Live action television shows based on films
Philippine medical television series
Television shows set in the Philippines